Edward J. "Ned" Kavanagh (11 February 1925 – 17 March 2018) was an Irish retired hurler who played as a midfielder for the Kilkenny senior team.

Born in Urlingford, County Kilkenny, Kavanagh first played competitive hurling during his school days at St. Kieran's College. He arrived on the inter-county scene at the age of twenty-two when he first linked up with the Kilkenny senior team, making his senior debut in the 1947 championship. Kavanagh played for just one championship season and won one All-Ireland medal.

At club level Kavanagh won one championship medal with Tullaroan.

Honours

Team

Tullaroan
Kilkenny Senior Hurling Championship (1): 1948

Kilkenny
All-Ireland Senior Hurling Championship (1): 1947

References

1925 births
2018 deaths
Tullaroan hurlers
Kilkenny inter-county hurlers
All-Ireland Senior Hurling Championship winners